Cambridge Heath is a railway station operated by London Overground in Bethnal Green, East London. Its three-letter station code is CBH and it is in Travelcard zone 2.

The station is named after the Cambridge Heath area of Hackney across Hackney Road.

History

Great Eastern Railway 1872-1922
The station was opened on 27 May 1872 by the Great Eastern Railway (GER) as part of a more direct route to Enfield Town which before opening was accessed via Angel Road station. When built the station, which is built on a viaduct, had two platforms and a station building on the east side. In 1894, with increasing traffic, the GER opened two additional tracks on the eastern side of the station, which are known as the Fast Lines today and allow longer distance trains to pass trains that stop at Cambridge Heath.

No platforms were ever built on these new lines. The 1872 station building was demolished and a new building to the east of the new tracks was built with the platforms accessed through a foot tunnel.

During World War I the station was closed as a wartime economy measure from 22 May 1916 reopening on 5 May 1919.

London & North Eastern Railway (1923-1947)

After the Railways Act 1921 the country's railways were grouped into four companies, with effect from 1 January 1923. At Hackney Downs the London & North Eastern Railway (LNER) took over operations of the GER services. The semaphore signalling was replaced by single searchlight signals which were able to display three-aspects (Green, Yellow or Red) through different a changeable lens arrangement, in 1935. It was also in 1935 that electrification of the lines through Cambridge Heath was suggested, although many years were to pass before these plans came to fruition.

British Railways (1948-1994)
On nationalisation in 1948 responsibility for operating the station fell to British Railways (Eastern Region).

The lines through Hackney were electrified in the late 1950s with electric services commencing operation on 21 November 1960.

The privatisation era (1994-present day)
The station, along with neighbouring London Fields, was for many years only served during weekday peak periods, with regular daytime services not restarting until 1998, and evening and Saturday services from 2001.

Oyster pay as you go cards were introduced at the station in 2008. The station and all services that call were previously operated by Abellio Greater Anglia. In 2015 Cambridge Heath transferred to London Overground and now appears on the tube map.

As of November 2018, the station will take part in a "pay by face" facial technology trial called "Gateless Gatelines". It will be used for a trial to "nudge" passengers into ensuring they tap their payment card. In the three-month data-gathering exercise 3D mapping "stereoscopic depth sensors" resembling ceiling-mounted shower heads will track people's movements. The system will be able to analyse from a person's movement through the gate whether they have touched in on the Oyster reader."

Services
The typical weekday off-peak service from Cambridge Heath is four trains per hour southbound to London Liverpool Street and two trains per hour northbound to Cheshunt and two to Enfield Town. Service frequency is increased at peak times. London Overground services to Chingford pass by on the fast lines.

Connections
London Buses services serves the station, key routes 26, 55, 254, 388, local routes 106 and D6, night routes N26, N55 and N253.

References

External links

Former Great Eastern Railway stations
Railway stations in the London Borough of Tower Hamlets
Railway stations in Great Britain opened in 1872
Railway stations in Great Britain closed in 1916
Railway stations in Great Britain opened in 1919
Railway stations served by London Overground
Cambridge Heath